The Kaicene F70 is a mid-size pickup truck that has been jointly developed by Changan Automobile and Groupe PSA under the Kaicene sub-brand since 2019.

Peugeot Landtrek 

The Peugeot Landtrek is a mid-size pickup truck that was first presented by French car manufacturer Peugeot, then part of Groupe PSA, in 2020. The platform and most of the bodywork is based on the Kaicene F70. 

The Landtrek is currently only sold in markets in Latin America, Sub-Saharan Africa and Asia. It was officially introduced on 18 November 2020 for the market in Mexico, the first market in Latin America to sell the Landtrek.

The 4Action trim level and the green colour were not available upon the vehicle's launch, when it was offered only in the Allure trim. It arrived in Peugeot showrooms in Mexico on 25 November 2020, available in both trim versions, powered by a 2.4-litre engine.

The South American model will also be launched in Brazil in 2023. However, after the merge and foundation of Stellantis, it was decided it would be sold under the Fiat brand which is more renowned in the local pick-up truck market than Peugeot.

In Malaysia, after being previewed in early January 2023, the Landtrek was launched by Peugeot's licensor in Malaysia, Bermaz Auto on 20 March 2023, with only the 1.9-litre diesel variant offered.

Powertrain

The Kaicene F70 is powered by four cylinder engines including a 2.4-litre petrol engine and a 1.9-litre diesel engine, as well as a 2.5-litre diesel engine.

Sales

As Peugeot Landtrek

References

2010s cars
Cars introduced in 2019
Pickup trucks
All-wheel-drive vehicles
Cars powered by transverse 4-cylinder engines